Shovkra is a rural locality (a selo) and the administrative centre of Shovkrinsky Selsoviet, Laksky District, Republic of Dagestan, Russia. The population was 581 as of 2010. There are 6 streets.

Geography 
Shovkra is located 3 km south of Kumukh (the district's administrative centre) by road, on the left bank of the Kazikumukhskoye Koysu River. Govkra and Chitur are the nearest rural localities.

Nationalities 
Laks live there.

References 

Rural localities in Laksky District